Finbarr Delaney (born 1956 in Blackrock, County Cork) is an Irish former sportsperson. He played hurling with his local club Blackrock and was a member of the Cork senior inter-county team for one season in 1989.

References

1956 births
Living people
Blackrock National Hurling Club hurlers
Cork inter-county hurlers